Francis Foster (1761 – 19 July 1847) was an English first-class cricketer.

Life 
Foster made one appearance for Hampshire in 1789, scoring ten runs. He played for Hampshire against an All-England Eleven on 2–5 September 1789 at Sevenoaks Vine, Hampshire winning by 15 runs.

Foster died at Hambledon in 1847.

References

Bibliography
 

1761 births
1847 deaths
English cricketers
English cricketers of 1787 to 1825
Hampshire cricketers